William Meath Baker (1 November 1857 – 15 January 1935) was an English pottery owner, benefactor, landowner and High Sheriff.

He was born in Hilderstone, Staffordshire, the son of the Revd. Ralph Bourne Baker and his wife Francis Crofton Singer, daughter of Joseph Henderson Singer, Bishop of Meath. He was educated at Eton College and Trinity College, Cambridge. In 1875, at the age of 18, he succeeded his father to the family pottery works of William Baker and Co in Fenton, Staffordshire and the country house of Hasfield Court in Gloucestershire. His father had inherited both properties from his unmarried elder brother William in 1865.

William Meath Baker established himself as a country squire at Hasfield, having little active involvement in the management of the Fenton pottery, and serving as a JP for Gloucestershire and High Sheriff for 1896–97. He was a keen mountain climber and member of the Alpine Club.

He was loyal to his Staffordshire roots and in the late 1880s funded at his own expense the building of Fenton Town Hall and other buildings in the town.

He was a close friend and patron of the composer Edward Elgar and is the "W.M.B." on whom Variation No IV of his Enigma Variations, composed in 1899, was based. The variation reflected Baker's impetuous and volatile nature. Two other variations were based on other members of the Baker family.

The Fenton Pottery business ceased trading in 1932 during the Great Depression.

He died in 1935. He had married twice, to Hannah Corbet in 1884 (who died in 1906) and secondly Sybill Wyrley-Birch in 1909. He had three sons by his first wife. Hasfield Court passed to his second son, Francis Ralph, his eldest son having become a Roman Catholic priest.

References

External links
 Biographies of family

1857 births
1935 deaths
People from the Borough of Stafford
People educated at Eton College
Alumni of Trinity College, Cambridge
High Sheriffs of Gloucestershire